Dale Adam Dye Jr. (born October 8, 1944) is an American actor, technical advisor, radio personality and writer. A decorated Marine veteran of the Vietnam War, Dye is the founder and head of Warriors, Inc., a technical advisory company specializing in portraying realistic military action in Hollywood films. Dye has also offered his expertise to television, such as the HBO miniseries Band of Brothers and The Pacific, and video games, including the Medal of Honor series.

Early life and education
Dye was born on October 8, 1944, in Cape Girardeau, Missouri, to Dale Adam and Della Grace (née Koehler) Dye. His father was a liquor salesman in and around St. Louis and took Dale with him as he visited working-class taverns. There he heard war stories from World War II veterans. One particular story about man-to-man fighting told by a Marine who said he had fought in the Pacific Theater piqued Dale's attention. He looked up the Battle of Iwo Jima that night and made up his mind to join the U.S. Marines. Dye was educated at St. Joseph's Military Academy in Chicago and the Missouri Military Academy in Mexico, Missouri.

Military career
Dye had hoped to attend the U.S. Naval Academy, but after failing the entrance exam three times ("My math and science skills were weak, and my English skills were huge") and having exhausted his family's meager funds getting through military academy, he enlisted in the U.S. Marines in January 1964. His unit was among the first to deploy to Vietnam in 1965. Officers in the unit noticed his keen observational skills and literary interest, and encouraged him to reclassify as a combat correspondent. He became one of a very few Marine combat correspondents. He sent stories to military publications and to the hometown newspapers of fellow Marines. As a correspondent, he saw more battles than many low-ranking infantrymen. Dye developed an immense respect for the grunts who took the brunt of any action.

Dye was wounded during the Tet Offensive in 1968. While recuperating in a rear area, the 2nd Battalion 3rd Marines—the unit he had traveled with—was preparing for Operation Ford. Dye persuaded the battalion commander to let him accompany the battalion as a war correspondent. During the next week, the battalion engaged in a number of firefights with units of the North Vietnamese People's Army of Vietnam (PAVN). On March 18, 1968, Dye replaced an assistant machine gunner who had been killed. The machine gun position was isolated forward of the remainder of the battalion. Although he was wounded, Dye exposed himself to intense enemy fire to retrieve ammunition for the machine gun to help hold off PAVN soldiers during an all-night firefight. During other engagements, he exposed himself to enemy fire to rescue several wounded Marines and a Navy corpsman. As a result of his actions, he was awarded the Bronze Star Medal with Combat "V" for heroism.

"Dye's heart is with the grunts", said Bob Rea, who worked with Dye as a combat correspondent during the worst of Tet. "He feels like he owes something to those people. He is a grunt wannabe." During three tours of duty in South Vietnam, he participated in 31 combat operations. During his 1967-to-1968 and 1969-to-1970 tours of duty, he was attached to two different battalions of the 1st Marine Division. Dye spent a total of 13 years as an enlisted Marine, rising to the rank of Master Sergeant before being appointed a warrant officer in 1976. Afterward he entered into the Limited Duty Program and became commissioned as a captain. He is considered a "mustang", an enlisted man who receives a commission as an officer. While he was a captain, he was deployed to Beirut for duty with the Multinational Force in Lebanon in 1982 and 1983. Shortly after his return, the Marine barracks were attacked, killing 241 Americans.

Fellow Marine correspondent Gustav Hasford dubbed him "Daddy D.A." (as he was among the oldest of the correspondents) and included him as a character in his first semi-autobiographical Vietnam novel The Short-Timers, and more extensively in his second, The Phantom Blooper. The movie based on Hasford's first novel Full Metal Jacket included the "Daddy D.A." character (played by Keith Hodiak), though neither the character nor Dye's name is explicitly mentioned in the dialogue.

In his book Dispatches, journalist Michael Herr provides a vivid picture of Dye during the chaos of the Tet Offensive and the Battle of Huế:

Later career
Dye retired from the Marine Corps in 1984 and founded Warriors, Inc. The company specializes in training actors in war films to portray their roles realistically, and provides research, planning, staging and on-set consultation for directors and other film-production personnel. His company is the top military consultant to Hollywood. While on active duty, Dye was a combat correspondent and earned a Bachelor of Arts degree in English from the University of Maryland University College. After retiring, Dye became a correspondent for the Soldier of Fortune magazine. He worked for the magazine for one year, during which he worked in Central America, providing guerrilla warfare training to troops in El Salvador and Nicaragua while reporting on conflicts in the region.

Dye has written several novels, including Run Between the Raindrops in 1985 (also published as Citadel) and Conduct Unbecoming (1992), and the novelization of the film Platoon. Along with wife Julia and comic-book artist Gerry Kissell, Dye created the critically acclaimed and best-selling graphic novel Code Word: Geronimo (IDW Publishing, 2011), which tells the story of the Navy SEAL raid on Osama bin Laden's compound.

Dye was determined to make Hollywood's depictions of battle more realistic. After unsuccessfully offering his services to a number of directors, he pitched fellow Vietnam War veteran Oliver Stone a plan to put actors through a mock boot camp before production of the movie Platoon. Dye put the principal actors—including Charlie Sheen, Willem Dafoe, Johnny Depp, and Forest Whitaker—through an immersive 30-day military-style training regimen. He limited how much food and water they received; when the actors slept, he fired blanks to keep the tired actors awake. Dye, who had a small role in the movie as Captain Harris, also wrote the novelization based on Stone's screenplay. After Platoons critical success, Dye played a role in another Vietnam War movie, Casualties of War, and also played Colonel Robert Sink in the HBO miniseries Band of Brothers, on which his company also worked. Dye also worked as a military technical adviser on Last of the Mohicans and the HBO companion piece to Band of Brothers, the ten-part miniseries The Pacific, which was shot in Australia. In 2017 Dye was recognized as an Honorary Member of the 506th Airborne  Infantry Regiment (General Robert Sink's regiment) for his work in bringing a high degree of quality and realism to cinematic portrayals of combat.

Dye appeared in Outbreak portraying Lieutenant Colonel Briggs, a U.S. Army officer. He played Theodore Roosevelt's superior officer Colonel Leonard Wood in the TNT miniseries Rough Riders. He appeared in Saving Private Ryan as an aide to General George Marshall; in Under Siege and Under Siege 2: Dark Territory as Captain Garza, an admiral's aide; in Spy Game as Commander Wiley during the rescue sequence; in Mission: Impossible as Frank Barnes of the CIA; in JFK as General Y; and in Starship Troopers as a high-ranking officer in the aftermath of the Brain Bug capture. Dye played himself in Entourage, teaching fictional character Vincent Chase to scuba-dive in preparation for his role in Aquaman. He appeared in the 2010 film Knight and Day with Tom Cruise and Cameron Diaz, and in Larry Crowne with Tom Hanks the following year. He was the technical adviser for the 1994 Oliver Stone movie Natural Born Killers, making a brief appearance as a fictionalized, police-lieutenant version of himself. Dye played Col. Porter in the TNT science fiction series Falling Skies from 2011 to 2013.  he was preparing to direct two films, No Better Place to Die, which he wrote, and Citizen Soldiers.

During the Iraq War, Dye was hired as a military commentator by radio station KFI AM 640 in Los Angeles and given a two-hour radio show. He hosted the History Channel's documentary series The Conquerors. Dye consulted during development of the Medal of Honor video games series. He was featured in two tracks on Hoobastank's CD Every Man for Himself. He voiced Colonel Robert Sink in the Brothers in Arms video game series, and had a cameo appearance as New Founding Father Donald Talbott in the 2014 film The Purge: Anarchy.

Bibliography

Filmography

Film

Television

Video games

Military awards
Dye's military decorations and awards include:

See also
List of notable people from Missouri
List of notable United States Marines

References

Further reading

External links

Warriors, Inc.

Dale Dye at LeaderNetwork.org

1944 births
20th-century American writers
American male film actors
American male television actors
American male voice actors
American male writers
United States Marine Corps personnel of the Vietnam War
Living people
Male actors from Missouri
Military personnel from Missouri
People educated at Missouri Military Academy
People from Cape Girardeau, Missouri
Radio personalities from Missouri
Recipients of the Order of Saint Maurice
United States Marine Corps officers
University of Maryland Global Campus alumni
Writers from Missouri
Recipients of the Meritorious Service Medal (United States)